14th Visual Effects Society Awards
February 2, 2016

Best Visual Effects in a Photoreal Feature:
Star Wars: The Force Awakens

Best Visual Effects in a Photoreal Episode:
Game of Thrones – The Dance of Dragons

The 14th Visual Effects Society Awards were held in Los Angeles at the Beverly Hilton Hotel on February 2, 2016, in honor to the best visual effects in film and television of 2015. Nominations were announced January 12, 2016.

Winners and nominees
(winners in bold)

Honorary Awards
Lifetime Achievement Award:
Ridley Scott

VES Visionary Award:
Syd Mead

Film

Television

Other categories

References

External links
 Nominees list

2014
2015 film awards
2015 television awards